T. J. Brennan (born 2000) is an Irish hurler who plays for Galway Senior Championship club Clarinbridge and at inter-county level with the Galway senior hurling team. He usually lines out as a centre-back.

Honours

Galway
National Hurling League (1): 2021
All-Ireland Minor Hurling Championship (1): 2017

References

1999 births
Living people
Clarinbridge hurlers
Galway inter-county hurlers